The statue of Mahatma Gandhi in Gandhi Maidan, Patna, is a public monument of India's father of Nation Mahatma Gandhi. The statue is the world's tallest bronze statue of Mahatma Gandhi. It was unveiled on 15 February 2013 by the then chief minister of Bihar, Nitish Kumar. It was established by Government of Bihar at a cost of 35 crore. The second tallest Gandhi statue turuvanur Chitradurga taluk and district karnataka

Description
It was sculpted by Ram Sutar's firm and is located on the western end of historic Gandhi Maidan, in front of St. Xavier's High School, Patna. It shows Mahatma Gandhi standing affectionately with two children.

Sculptor Anil, who runs Ramsutar Arts Pvt Ltd, said "the statue, showcasing Gandhi with a smiling look, will spread the message of world peace and motivate all to bridge the divide between the rich and poor."

Gallery

See also
Gandhi Sangrahalaya, Patna
List of artistic depictions of Mahatma Gandhi

References

2013 sculptures
Buildings and structures completed in 2013
Buildings and structures in Patna
Colossal statues in India
Outdoor sculptures in India
Sculptures of children
Sculptures of men in India
Statues in Bihar
Patna
2013 establishments in Bihar